Events from the year 1847 in Poland

Births
 September 12 – Wacław Mayzel in Kunów
 October 16 – Arnold Fibiger in Kalisz
 Emil Godlewski (senior)

Deaths
 March 10 – Nepomucena Kostecka
 July 28 – Jan Nepomucen Głowacki in Kraków
 Kajetan Garbiński

See also